Heterachne is a genus of Australian plants in the grass family.

 Species
 Heterachne abortiva (R.Br.) Druce - Northern Territory, Queensland, Western Australia
 Heterachne baileyi C.E.Hubb. - Queensland 
 Heterachne gulliveri Benth. - Northern Territory, Queensland, Western Australia

References

Poaceae genera
Endemic flora of Australia
Chloridoideae